Christian unions (CUs) are evangelical Christian student groups. They exist in many countries and are often affiliated with either the  International Fellowship of Evangelical Students (through a national body) or the Campus Crusade for Christ. Many Christian unions are one of the societies affiliated to their universities' students' union. As a broader term, Christian union may refer to any Christian student society, such as SCM and Fusion groups.

In the United Kingdom
Since their split from the Student Christian Movement in the early twentieth century, most Christian Unions in the United Kingdom are affiliated to the Universities and Colleges Christian Fellowship (UCCF). Some UK Christian Unions have had difficult relationships with the students' union due to their policy of allowing leaders to choose their successors in order, they argue, to ensure a Christian leadership (students' unions often require democratic processes be followed), opinions on issues such as homosexuality and the role of women, and the requirement that leaders affirm a fixed conservative evangelical Doctrinal Basis. Many, but not all, CUs require all members to sign this Doctrinal Basis. The latter includes doctrinal statements that go beyond the historic ecumenical creeds, e.g. recognising the Bible as the sole authority, and belief in penal substitution. A considerable number of Christian students have problems affirming these points, and feel excluded from Christian Unions. This has led to calls for local Christian Unions to change their name to something more specific, e.g. Evangelical Christian Union.

Christian Unions are active in evangelism to fellow-students. As well as hosting traditional talks and debates, they may hold unconventional events such as "Text a Toastie". These particular events involve providing a number to students, to which they text a question about God, the bible, or Christianity more generally, and in response two members of the Christian Union deliver a toastie to them and answer their question. While considered unusual by some, this has proven an effective way of communicating with other students for many CUs.

See also
International Fellowship of Evangelical Students (international organisation)
Campus Crusade for Christ (similar international organisation, principally American)
Universities and Colleges Christian Fellowship (UCCF, UK national organisation)
Cambridge Inter-Collegiate Christian Union (CICCU)
Oxford Inter-Collegiate Christian Union (OICCU)
List of Christian Unions in Great Britain
Other UK national organisations
Student Christian Movement (SCM, established 1889)

References

External links
UCCF
IFES Ireland
IFES Europe
International Fellowship of Evangelical Students

Christian Unions and Student Unions
Student union suspends Christian group Article about Birmingham University Evangelical Christian Union in the Guardian newspaper  
Hull CU vindicated Article from an evangelical publication
Christian Union returns from ban Warwick University
Trials of 2004 An account of Christian Union at the University College London - disaffiliation from the Student Union and later re-affiliation
Christians threaten legal action BBC News article about Exeter University CU, and the ongoing dispute there.
UCCF Position Paper - Equal Opportunities Policies and Faith-based Student Societies

Christian student societies in the United Kingdom
Fellowships